The 2005–06 Temple Owls men's basketball team represented Temple University in the 2005–06 NCAA Division I men's basketball season. They were led by head coach John Chaney and played their home games at the Liacouras Center. The Owls are members of the Atlantic 10 Conference. They finished the season 17–15, 8–8 in A-10 play, and reached the 2006 National Invitation Tournament. Chaney retired at the conclusion of the season.

Roster

References

2014-15 Temple Owls Men's Basketball Media Guide

Temple
Temple Owls men's basketball seasons
Temple
Temple
Temple